Jo Su-yeon (born 6 July 1994) is a South Korean handball player for the SK Sugar Gliders and South Korean national team.

She participated at the 2015 World Women's Handball Championship.

References

1994 births
Living people
South Korean female handball players
Universiade medalists in handball
Universiade silver medalists for South Korea
Medalists at the 2015 Summer Universiade